Michelbach is a river of Bavaria, Germany. It is a right tributary of the Bessenbach near Keilberg.

See also
List of rivers of Bavaria

Rivers of Bavaria
Rivers of the Spessart
Rivers of Germany